The following is a list of trijet aircraft.

Proposed or suspended trijet developments 
 Boeing 747-300 Trijet – downsized 747 to compete with the DC-10 and L-1011, changed to four engines
 Blended Wing Body Trijet – proposed design based on the Boeing X-48
 McDonnell Douglas MD-XX – stretched derivative of the DC-10, project shelved
 North American NR-349 – proposed interceptor derivative of the A-5 Vigilante, cancelled
 Airbus twin-tail trijet, – status unknown
 Dassault Supersonic Business Jet – suspended
 Aerion AS2 - Suspended
 Sukhoi-Gulfstream S-21
 Boom Technology Overture - 3-engine design proposed, but changed to 4-engine
 Boeing 777 – Originally envisioned as a trijet 767 in the 1970s to compete with the DC-10 and the L-1011; later became a new twin-engine design.

See also 
 Trijet

References 

trijet
Trijets